Hendrickson House is one of the oldest houses in the U.S. state of Delaware and one of the oldest surviving Swedish-American homes in the United States.

The house was originally built in the early 18th century in Chester, Pennsylvania as the home of Swedish farmer Andrew Hendrickson and his wife, Brigitta Morton, who were both born in the New Sweden colony. In 1958 the house was moved to Wilmington, Delaware. The Hendrickson House is part of Old Swedes Historic Site, which includes Holy Trinity Church (Old Swedes) (1698–99) and burial ground (1638), a National Historic Landmark.

See also
 List of the oldest buildings in Delaware
 List of the oldest buildings in Pennsylvania

References

External links
 

Chester, Pennsylvania
Houses completed in the 18th century
Houses in Delaware County, Pennsylvania
Houses in Wilmington, Delaware
18th-century establishments in Delaware
Swedish-American history
Swedish-American culture in Delaware
New Sweden